Fernow may refer to:

Fernow (surname)
Fernow Experimental Forest, a research forest in Tucker County, Virginia, United States
Mount Fernow, a mountain of Washington, United States